Diet Coke with Citrus Zest is a type of Coca-Cola with lime and citrus added to it. Diet Coke with Citrus Zest is produced by the Coca-Cola Company and was introduced in 2007. It was available in the United Kingdom and Bosnia for purchase as was the other variant to be used after Diet Coke and Diet Coke With Lime. It was flavored with both lime and citrus zest.

The name for this product was based on the word zest in reference to its citrus zest flavoring.

References
 The Cola Index

External links
 Diet Coke Bosnia official website

Diet drinks
Coca-Cola cola brands
Products introduced in 2007
Citrus sodas